Edwin Hamilton Gifford, DD (18 December 1820 – 4 May 1905) was an eminent Anglican priest, schoolmaster, and author of the second half of the 19th century.

Edwin Gifford was educated at Shrewsbury and St John's College, Cambridge. He was ordained in 1845.   He was Second Master at his old school then Chief Master of King Edward's School, Birmingham and an honorary Canon of Worcester. Later he was Rector of Walgrave then Much Hadham. From 1884 to 1889 he was Archdeacon of London.  He died on 4 May 1905.

Emma Lavinia Gifford, the first wife of Thomas Hardy, was his niece.

Works
Glory of God in Man, 1864
Voices of the Prophets
Romans in the Speaker's Commentary, 1881
Authorship of Psalm cx, 1892
St Cyril of Jerusalem in the Library of Nicene and Post-Nicene Fathers, 1894
The Incarnation: A Study of Philippians 2:5-11, 1896
Eusebius of Caesarea: Praeparatio Evangelica (translation), 5 Vols., 1903

Notes

External links
 

1820 births
Chief Masters of King Edward's School, Birmingham
People educated at Shrewsbury School
Fellows of St John's College, Cambridge
Archdeacons of London
1905 deaths
Alumni of St John's College, Cambridge